New York City has been called the media capital of the world.  Many journalists work in Manhattan, reporting about international, American, business, entertainment, and New York metropolitan area-related matters.

New Yorkers in journalism

A
 David Aaro – Fox News Digital
 Ben Aaron – WPIX
 Roz Abrams – multiple broadcast networks
 Ai Heping – China Daily
 Marv Albert – NBC Sports
 Cristina Alesci – CNN
 Dari Alexander – WNYW
 Sharyn Alfonsi – 60 Minutes
 Yashar Ali – New York magazine
 Craig Allen – chief meteorologist, WCBS 880
 Ernie Anastos – WABC-TV, WCBS-TV, WNYW
 Jodi Applegate – WNYW
 Diego Arias – Telemundo
 Rose Arce – producer, journalist
 Priya Arora –The New York Times
 David Asman – Fox Business, Fox News
 Maggie Astor – The New York Times
 Michael Ausiello – multiple media platforms
 John Avlon – CNN

B
 Sade Baderinwa – WABC-TV
 Brooke Baldwin – formerly of CNN
 Brian Balthazar – multiple networks
 Julie Banderas – Fox News
 Anirvan Banerji – columnist, director of research, Bloomberg News, co-founder, Economic Cycle Research Institute
 Dean Baquet – executive editor, The New York Times
 Justin Bariso – Inc., Time
 Peter Barnes – multiple business platform networks
 Josh Barro – Business Insider
 Maria Bartiromo – Fox Business
 Joy Behar – The View
 John Berman – CNN
 Len Berman – WNBC, NBC Sports
 Bill Beutel – late journalist, WABC-TV
 Gabriela Bhaskar – photojournalist, The New York Times
 Jedediah Bila – Fox News
 Kate Bolduan – CNN
 Sandra Bookman – WABC-TV
 Keith Boykin – syndicated columnist
 Ben Brantley – The New York Times
 Margaret Brennan – CBS News, CNBC
 Malan Breton – fashion journalist, OK!
 Contessa Brewer – multiple networks
 Dave Briggs – Fox News, NBC
 Tom Brokaw – NBC News
 Frank Bruni – The New York Times
 Mika Brzezinski – MSNBC
 Erin Burnett – CNN
 Brenda Buttner – Fox News

C
 Ana Cabrera – CNN
 Jack Cafferty – multiple platforms
 Will Cain – Fox News
 Mary Calvi – WCBS-TV, weekend anchor for Inside Edition
 Alisyn Camerota – CNN
 Rachel Campos-Duffy – Fox News
 Carl Cameron – formerly of Fox News
 Gretchen Carlson – formerly of Fox News
 Tracee Carrasco – Fox Business
 Michelle Caruso-Cabrera – multiple business journalism platforms
 Cheryl Casone – Fox Business
 Michelle Castillo – Cheddar
 Marysol Castro – meteorologist, Good Morning America
 Neil Cavuto – Fox News
 Janaki Chada – Politico
 Sam Champion – meteorologist, WABC-TV
 Kathy YL Chan – Bloomberg News
 Wilfred Chan – The Guardian
 Clio Chang – Curbed
 Gordon G. Chang – multiple platforms
 Juju Chang – ABC News
 Kenneth Chang – The New York Times
 Laura Chang – journalist, editor of the Booming blog, The New York Times
 Lia Chang – photojournalist, multiple media platforms
 Sophia Chang – Gothamist, WNYC public radio
 Michelle Charlesworth – WABC-TV
 Julia Chatterley – CNN International
 Adrian Chen – investigative journalist, staff writer at The New Yorker
 Aria Hangyu Chen – multimedia journalist
 Brian X. Chen – lead consumer technology journalist, The New York Times
 Caroline Chen – journalist, ProPublica
 David W. Chen – investigative journalist, City Hall bureau chief, The New York Times
 Elaine Chen – digital editor, The New York Times
 Joie Chen – multiple broadcast networks
 Stefanos Chen – real estate reporter, The New York Times
 Julie Chen Moonves – multiple broadcast networks
 Evelyn Cheng – CNBC
 Roger Cheng – executive editor in charge of breaking news, CNET News
 Kiran Chetry – Fox News
 Paul Cheung – global director of interactive and digital news production, Associated Press
 Heather Childers – Fox News, Newsmax TV
 Alina Cho – CNBC
 Elizabeth Cho –  Bracha
 Liz Cho – WABC-TV
 Ann Choi – senior inestigative reporter, Bloomberg Businessweek
 Kelly Choi – NYC Media
 Niraj Chokshi – business journalist, The New York Times
 Denise Chow – science and technology editor, NBC News
 Alexis Christoforous – Yahoo! Finance
 Dominic Chu – CNBC
 Kay Chun – cooking editor, The New York Times
 Christine Chung – The New York Times
 Connie Chung – multiple broadcast networks
 Andy Cohen – multiple media platforms
 Kaitlan Collins – CNN
 Liz Claman – Fox Business
 Stephen Colbert – CBS, The Late Show with Stephen Colbert
 Jamie Colby – Fox News
 Bertha Coombs – CNBC
 Anderson Cooper – 60 Minutes, CBS, CNN
 Anthony Cormier – BuzzFeed News
 Howard Cosell – multiple sports platform outlets
 Bob Costas – NBC Sports
 Katie Couric – multiple broadcast networks
 Jim Cramer – CNBC
 Walter Cronkite – CBS News (d. 2009)
 Chris Cuomo – Nexstar Media Group
 S. E. Cupp – CNN
 Ann Curry – investigative journalist

D
 Aswath Damodaran – economic journalist, professor at New York University Stern School of Business
 James Dao – op-ed editor, The New York Times
 Ted David – founding anchor, CNBC
 Janice Dean – Fox News
 Ernabel Demillo – CUNY TV
 Laurie Dhue – multiple broadcast platform networks
 John Dickerson – CBS News
 Angela Dimayuga – chef, food critic for The New York Times
 Diane Dimond – multiple broadcast platform networks
 Iva Dixit – audience editor, The New York Times Magazine
 Lou Dobbs – formerly of Fox Business
 Maureen Dowd – The New York Times
 Amanda Drury – CNBC
 Maurice DuBois – WCBS-TV
 David W. Dunlap – The New York Times
 Vladimir Duthiers – CBS News

E
 Ainsley Earhardt – Fox News
 Sara Eisen – CNBC
 Sarah Kate Ellis – multimedia executive, CEO of GLAAD
 Sharon Epperson – CNBC
 Kelly Evans –CNBC

F
 David Faber – CNBC
 Tamsen Fadal – WPIX
 Jimmy Fallon – NBC, The Tonight Show Starring Jimmy Fallon
 Christina Fan – WCBS-TV
 Nicholas Fandos – The New York Times
 Paula Faris – formerly of ABC News and The View
 Pat Farnack – WCBS 880
 Ronan Farrow – The New Yorker
 Harris Faulkner – Fox News
 Henry Fernandez – Fox Business Network
 Luis Ferré-Sadurní – The New York Times
 Donna Fiducia – Fox News
 Jill Filipovic – CNN
 Karen Finerman – CNBC
 Ira Joe Fisher – The Saturday Early Show
 Jami Floyd – formerly of Court TV News
 Rick Folbaum – Fox News
 Alison Fox – Travel + Leisure
 Justin Fox – Bloomberg News
 Melissa Francis – Fox News
 Thomas Friedman – The New York Times
 Wilfred Frost – CNBC
 Scarlet Fu – Bloomberg Television anchor, New York Stock Exchange reporter
 Ziwe Fumudoh – multiple media platforms
 Esther Fung – journalist, The Wall Street Journal

G
 Michael Gargiulo – formerly of WTTG
 Laurie Garrett – public health journalist
 Mara Gay – The New York Times editorial board
 Susie Gharib – Nightly Business Report
 Kathie Lee Gifford – formerly of Today
 Devika Girish – film critic, The New York Times, other multimedia platforms
 Alexis Glick – Formerly of Fox Business
 Jeff Glor – CBS News
 Whoopi Goldberg – The View, moderator
 Marci Gonzalez – ABC News
 Bianna Golodryga – formerly of ABC News and CBS News
 Stephanie Gosk – NBC News
 Anne-Marie Green – CBS News
 Lauren Green – Fox News's
 Bill Griffeth – CNBC
 Roger Grimsby – WABC
 Michael Grynbaum – The New York Times
 Kimberly Guilfoyle – political analyst
 Bryant Gumbel – formerly of Today and Real Sports with Bryant Gumbel
 Greg Gumbel – CBS Sports and formerly of NBC Sports
 Alisha Haridasani Gupta – gender editor, The New York Times
 Ritika Gupta – Bloomberg News
 Savannah Guthrie – Today
 Greg Gutfeld – Fox News

H
 Clyde Haberman – The New York Times
 Maggie Haberman – The New York Times
 Jenna Bush Hager – Today
 Sara Haines – ABC News, The View
 Tamron Hall – broadcast journalist, television talk show host, author
 Katie Halper – WBAI
 Lisa Kailai Han – investing reporter, Business Insider 
 Sean Hannity – Fox News
 Donna Hanover – WPIX, WNYW
 Nanette Hansen – CBS, NBC, CNBC
 Poppy Harlow – CNN
 Gerry Harrington – United Press International, CNN
 David Harsanyi – National Review
 Aishah Hasnie – Fox News
 Elisabeth Hasselbeck – Fox News, The View
 Chris Hayes – MSNBC
 Kathleen Hays – multiple business platforms
 Amy He – journalist, China Daily
 Angela He –The New York Times
 Gary He – Vox Media
 Pete Hegseth – Fox News
 Bill Hemmer – Fox News
 Charo Henríquez – senior editor of Digital Strategy, The New York Times
 Ed Henry – Fox News, CNN
 Sue Herera – CNBC
 Catherine Herridge – Fox News and CBS News
 E.D. Hill – Fox News
 Erica Hill – CBS News
 Perez Hilton – blogger
 Jack Hobbs – New York Post
 Stephen Holden – The New York Times
 Lester Holt – NBC News
 Euny Hong – author, journalist
 Nicole Hong – law enforcement and courts journalist, The New York Times
 Hong Xiao – China Daily
 Kit Hoover – Fox News
 Margaret Hoover – PBS
 Sunny Hostin – ABC News, The View, legal analyst
 Cindy Hsu – WCBS-TV
 Hua Hsu – The New Yorker
 Tiffany Hsu – business desk, The New York Times
 Krystal Hu – Reuters
 Winnie Hu – The New York Times
 Eddie Huang – writer, author of Fresh Off the Boat: A Memoir
 Juliet Huddy – WABC 770, Fox News
 Abby Huntsman – The View
 Janice Huff – chief meteorologist, WNBC
 Brit Hume – Fox News

I
 Jimmy Im – senior lifestyle writer, CNBC
 Laura Ingraham – The Ingraham Angle
 Carol Iovanna – Fox News, WCBS-TV
 Walter Isaacson – multimedia journalist

J
 Gregg Jarrett – Fox News
 Rebecca Jarvis – ABC News
 Peter Jennings – ABC News (d. 2005)
 Jim Jensen – WCBS-TV
 Mike Jerrick – Fox News
 Hezi Jiang – China Daily
 John Johnson – multiple broadcast networks
 Kristine Johnson – WCBS-TV and formerly of Early Today
 Sheinelle Jones – NBC News
 Star Jones – The View
 Bill Jorgensen – WNYW
 Andrea Joyce – CBS Sports and NBC Sports

K
 Jay Caspian Kang – The New York Times Magazine
 Jodi Kantor – The New York Times
 Jason Kao – The New York Times
 Megyn Kelly – formerly of NBC News and Fox News
 Terry Keenan – formerly of CNN and Fox News
 Kennedy – Fox Business
 Joe Kernen – CNBC
 Neeraj Khemlani – executive, Hearst Communications, CBS
 Brian Kilmeade – Fox & Friends
 Allen Kim – digital producer, culture and trends, CNN
 CeFaan Kim – journalist, WABC-TV
 Elizabeth Kim – Gothamist
 Eric Kim – food columnist, The New York Times
 Eugene Kim – tech journalist, CNBC
 Jasmine Kim – digital content journalist, CNBC
 Michelle J. Kim – digital content journalist, WNBC-TV
 Tae Kim – investigative journalist, CNBC
 Ye-rin Kim – The Korea Herald
 Michael Kimmelman – architecture critic, The New York Times
 Gayle King – CBS News
 Anna Kisselgoff – dance critic, cultural news reporter, The New York Times
 Genevieve Ko – senior food editor, The New York Times
 Anna Kodé – real estate and style writer, The New York Times
 Sally Kohn – political commentator
 Anna Kooiman – Fox News
 Steve Kornacki – NBC News
 Hoda Kotb – Today
 Marcia Kramer – WCBS-TV
 John Krasinski – actor, filmmaker, Some Good News
 Priya Krishna – food writer, The New York Times
 Sukanya Krishnan – WNYW
 Steve Kroft – 60 Minutes
 Paul Krugman – The New York Times
 Larry Kudlow – Fox Business
 Howard Kurtz – Fox News

L
 Jennifer Lahmers – WNYW
 KK Rebecca Lai – graphics editor, The New York Times
 Nina Lakhani – The Guardian
 Padma Lakshmi – author, television host, cookbook actress, model
 Chau Lam – Gothamist
 Katherine Lam – digital producer, Fox News
 Chang W. Lee – photojournalist, The New York Times
 Edmund Lee – The New York Times
 Jenna Lee – Fox News through Fox Business
 Jennifer 8. Lee – credits including previous The New York Times journalism
 Karen Lee – News 12 Networks
 Melissa Lee – news anchor, Fast Money on CNBC
 Min Jin Lee – author, journalist
 MJ Lee – CNN
 Brian Lehrer – WNYC
 John Leland – The New York Times
 Don Lemon – CNN
 Susan Li – multiple business journalism
 Kristin Lin – op-ed columnist, The New York Times
 Kathryn Lindsay – The Guardian
 Betty Liu – Bloomberg News
 Jennifer Liu – CNBC
 Bryan Llenas – Fox News
 Lynda Lopez – multiple broadcast networks and media platforms
 Hugo Lowell – The Guardian
 Rich Lowry – National Review
 Denise Lu – The New York Times
 Michael Lucas – The Advocate, HuffPost
 Richard Lui – MSNBC, NBC News
 Joan Lunden – Today
 Michael Luo – The New York Times

M
 Martha MacCallum – Fox News
 Elizabeth MacDonald – Fox Business
 Consuelo Mack – WealthTrack
 Rachel Maddow – MSNBC
 Sapna Maheshwari – business journalist, The New York Times
 Clare Malone – New York magazine
 Apoorva Mandavilli – health care and science journalist, The New York Times, founding editor-in-chief of the autism news site Spectrum
 Dave Marash – WCBS-TV
 Sal Marchiano – WPIX
 Coral Murphy Marcos – The Guardian
 Karol Markowicz – Fox News, New York Post
 Michele Marsh – WCBS-TV, WNBC
 Carol Martin – WCBS-TV
 Anthony Mason – CBS News
 Tyler Mathisen – CNBC
 Jane Mayer – The New Yorker
 Bill Mazer – WNBC
 Michael Mazzeo – Legal Sports Report
 Meghan McCain – The View
 Bill McCuddy – Fox News Dagen McDowell – Fox Business, Fox News
 Lisa McRee – ABC News
 Robin Meade – HLN
 Manish Mehta – New York Daily News Ved Mehta – late, blind staff writer, The New Yorker Jillian Mele – Fox News
 Larry Mendte – WABC
 Curt Menefee – Fox Sports
 Seth Meyers – NBC, Late Night with Seth Meyers Sarah Min – investing reporter, CNBC Ligaya Mishan – food critic, The New York Times Maria Molina – Fox Cast weather meteorologist
 Seema Mody – CNBC
 Jeenah Moon – photojournalist, The New York Times Jeanne Moos – CNN Stephen Morgan – meteorologist, Fox Weather Clayton Morris – Fox News
 Adam Moss – New York magazine
 David Muir – ABC News
 John Muller – WPIX
 Lisa Murphy – Bloomberg Television
 Michael Musto – author, journalist

N
 Vinita Nair – multiple broadcast networks
 Sridhar Natarajan – Bloomberg News
 Heather Nauert – multiple platforms
 Jim Nelson – editor-in-chief, GQ magazine
 Arthel Neville – Fox News
 Alfred Ng – associate engagement editor, New York Daily News Betty Nguyen – WPIX
 Reena Ninan – CBS News
 Trevor Noah – Comedy Central, The Daily Show with Trevor Noah Joe Nocera – Bloomberg News
 Caitlin Nolan – Inside Edition Deborah Norville – Inside Edition David Novarro – WABC-TV
 Niu Yue – China DailyO
 Dean Obeidallah – CNN
 Kelly O'Donnell – CNBC
 Lawrence O'Donnell – MSNBC
 Norah O'Donnell – CBS News
 Rosie O'Donnell – The View Keith Olbermann – sports and political commentator, multiple media platforms
 Diana Olick – CNBC
 John Oliver – Last Week Tonight with John Oliver Meg Oliver – CBS News
 Bill O'Reilly – formerly of Fox News and Inside Edition Charles Osgood – CBS News (retired)
 Lisa Oz – Fox 5 New York
 Mehmet Oz – host, The Dr. Oz Show, medical correspondent, Fox News

P
 Christina Park – multiple broadcast networks
 Anushka Patil – social strategies editor, The New York Times Jane Pauley – CBS News
 Scott Pelley – 60 Minutes, CBS
 Perri Peltz – CNN
 Uma Pemmaraju – formerly of WMAR-TV, Fox News
 Dana Perino – Fox News
 Nicole Petallides – TD Ameritrade Network
 Ed Pilkington – The Guardian Jeanine Pirro – Fox News
 Bob Pisani – CNBC
 Byron Pitts – ABC News Robin Pogrebin – The New York Times David Portnoy – blogger, founder, Barstool Sports
 Neha Prakash – Condé Nast Traveler Nidhi Prakash – BuzzFeed News Elizabeth Prann – Fox News, HLN

Q
 Norma Quarles – NBC News
 Richard Quest – CNN
 Betty Quick – CNBC
 Elaine Quijano – CBS News
 Lonnie Quinn – chief meteorologist, WCBS-TV
 Carl Quintanilla – CNBC

R
 Anita Raghavan – The New York Times, author, The Billionaire's Apprentice Shalini Ramachandran – The Wall Street Journal Swapna Venugopal Ramaswamy – National Housing and Economy correspondent, USA TODAY Vandana Rambaran – journalist, Fox News
 Nicolas Rapold – journalist and critic, The New York Times Dan Rather – multiple broadcast networks
 Judith Regan – Judith Regan Tonight Trish Regan – multiple broadcast networks
 David Remnick – editor, The New Yorker Michael Riedel – New York Post, WOR Birmania Ríos – Univision
 Kelly Ripa – anchor, Live with Kelly and Ryan Bill Ritter – WABC-TV
 Frances Rivera – NBC News
 Geraldo Rivera – multiple news outlets
 Tanya Rivero – CBSN
 Amy Robach – ABC News
 Deborah Roberts – ABC News
 Robin Roberts – ABC News, ESPN
 Thomas Roberts – multiple endeavors
 Darlene Rodriguez – WNBC-TV
 Deborah Rodriguez – CBS News
 Julie Roginsky – Fox News
 Al Roker – Today Christine Romans – CNN
 Rong Xiaoqing – Curbed Steven Romo – NBC News, MSNBC Charlie Rose – formerly of multiple news outlets
 Jim Rosenfeld – WCAU
 David Roth – Defector Media Reena Roy – WCBS-TV
Dave Rubin – political commentator, YouTuber, talk show host, and author
 Christopher Ruddy – Newsmax Amber Ruffin – Peacock Stephanie Ruhle – MSNBC Louis Rukeyser – Wall Street Week with Louis Rukeyser, Wall $treet Week with FORTUNE, Louis Rukeyser's Wall Street Tim Russert – formerly of NBC News and CNBC
 Jim Ryan – WNYW
 Sam Ryan – WABC-TV

S
 Hazel Sanchez – WCBS-TV
 Aditi Sangal – CNN Rick Santelli – CNBC
 Nicole Saphier – medical correspondent, Fox News
 Diane Sawyer – multiple broadcast networks
 Chuck Scarborough – WNBC-TV
 Joe Scarborough – MSNBC
 Dick Schaap – multiple platform outlets
 Bob Schieffer – CBS News
 Rob Schmitt – Fox News
 Mike Schneider – formerly ABC News, NBC News, and Bloomberg Television
 Michael Schoen – WCBS-880
 John Schubeck – NBC News
 Jim Sciutto – CNN
 A. O. Scott – The New York Times Jon Scott – Fox News
 Rosanna Scotto – WNYW
 Ryan Seacrest – producer on multiple media platforms, television presenter
 Dionne Searcey – The New York Times John Seigenthaler – NBC News
 Bob Sellers – multiple business journalism outlets
 Anirban Sen – Reuters Suzanne Send – Fox News, Onion News Network Hannah Seo – The New York Times 
 Andrew Serwer – editor-in-chief, Yahoo! Finance
 Jeanette Settembre – Fox Business Network
 Eric Shawn – Fox News
 Sonam Sheth – Business Insider Carley Shimkus – Fox News
 Aditi Shrikant – CNBC Maria Shriver – formerly of CBS News and NBC News
 Choire Sicha – editor, The New York Times Style section
 Marc Siegel – medical correspondent, Fox News
 Nate Silver – statistician, founder/editor of FiveThirtyEight Sue Simmons – WNBC
 Lauren Simonetti – Fox Business
 Jane Skinner – Fox News
 Simran Jeet Singh – Religion News Service
 Sangeeta Singh-Kurtz – New York magazine
 Ben Smith – editor-in-chief, BuzzFeed News Harry Smith – NBC News and formerly of CBS News
 Rolland Smith – WCBS
 Sandra Smith – CNBC and formerly of Fox News
 Shepard Smith – co-founding anchor of Fox News
 Tracy Smith – 48 Hours, CBS News Sunday Morning Tom Snyder – multiple broadcast platforms
 Kate Snow – multiple broadcast platforms
 Ravi Somaiya – Columbia Journalism Review Hugh Son – journalist, CNBC
 Zijia Song – journalist, multiple media platforms
 Andrew Ross Sorkin – The New York Times, CNBC Lara Spencer – ABC News
 Hari Sreenivasan – PBS NewsHour Weekend Sreenath Sreenivasan – technology journalist
 Lesley Stahl – 60 Minutes Brian Stelter – CNN
 George Stephanopoulos – ABC News
 Emily Stewart – Vox Media
 Jon Stewart – Comedy Central
 Lori Stokes – WNYW
 Michael Strahan – ABC News
 Brian Sullivan – multiple broadcast journalist platforms
 A. G. Sulzberger – journalist, publisher, The New York Times Arthur Ochs Sulzberger Jr. – journalist, chairman, The New York Times Company
 Arya Sundaram – The New York Times Aarthi Swaminathan – Yahoo! Finance Stephanie Sy – CNN

T
 André Leon Talley – late fashion journalist, Vogue Gillian Tan – Bloomberg Gadfly columnist covering private equity and mergers and acquisitions
 Terry Tang – deputy editorial page editor, The New York Times Andrea Tantaros – Fox News
 Kayla Tausche – CNBC
 Felicia Taylor – CNBC
 Lauren Thomas – CNBC
 Mark Thompson – former president and chief executive officer, The New York Times Company
 Kat Timpf – Fox News
 Anthony Tommasini – music critic, The New York Times Kaity Tong – WPIX
 Andy Towle – blogger, political commentator, founder of Towleroad Crystal Tse – Bloomberg News
 Katy Tur – NBC News
 Dana Tyler – WCBS-TV

U
 David Ushery – WNBC

V
 Greta Van Susteren – multiple broadcast networks
 Elizabeth Vargas – multiple broadcast networks
 Jane Velez-Mitchell – multiple broadcast networks
 Ali Velshi – MSNBC
 Arun Venugopal – reporter, WNYC, journalist, The New York Times Linda Vester – Fox News
 Meredith Vieira – 25 Words or Less, The Meredith Vieira Show, The View, Today Leland Vittert – NewsNation and formerly of Fox News
 Shivani Vora – The New York Times Rohit Vyas – First and longest serving Indian American broadcast journalist

W
 Gernot Wagner – Bloomberg News "Risky Climate" columnist
 Grant Wahl – late sports journalist, multiple media platforms 
 Bree Walker – WCBS-TV, KCBS-TV
 Barbara Walters – multiple broadcast networks
 Christine Wang – news editor, CNBC
 Echo Wang – Reuters Lu Wang – Bloomberg News Vivian Wang – The New York Times Rachel Warren – MedPage Today
 Jim Watkins – WTNH
 Jesse Watters – Fox News Rolonda Watts – former host of Rolonda and on-camera announcer for Judge Joe Brown Justin Wee – photojournalist, The New York Times Juli Weiner – HBO Bill Weir – CNN
 Jane Wells – CNBC
 Jann Wenner – co-founder, publisher, Rolling Stone Ross Westgate – CNBC
 Bill Whitaker – 60 Minutes, CBS News
 Brian Williams – NBC News
 Diana Williams – WABC-TV
 Eboni K. Williams – Fox News
 Juan Williams – Fox News
 Gerri Willis – multiple broadcast platforms
 Anna Wintour – Editor-in-Chief, Vogue Alex Witt – MSNBC
 Joe Witte – multiple broadcast networks
 Warner Wolf – multiple broadcast networks
 Jenna Wolfe – journalist, TV news host
 Andrea Wong – Bloomberg News
 Carmen Rita Wong – CNBC
 Natalie Wong – Bloomberg News
 Vanessa Wong – BuzzFeed Kelly Wright – Fox NewsX
 An Rong Xu – photojournalist
 Shelly Xu – field producer, Fox News 

Y
 Kimberly Yam – HuffPost Sophia Yan – The Daily Telegraph, classical pianist
 Andrew Yang – Crains New York, CNN Jeff Yang – "Tao Jones" columnist for The Wall Street Journal Lucy Yang – WABC-TV
 Lucy Yang (disambiguate) – Zola
 Maya Yang – journalist, The Guardian Stephen Yang – New York Post Yueqi Yang – Bloomberg News Vivian Yee – The New York Times Claudia Yeung – communications director, Hong Kong Economic and Trade Office
 William Yu – digital media strategist
 Jada Yuan – travel correspondent, The New York Times Yun Li – CNBCZ
 Paula Zahn – multiple broadcast networks
 Fareed Zakaria – CNN
 Mihir Zaveri – The New York Times Ginger Zee – chief meteorologist, ABC News
 Benjamin P. Zhang – Business Insider Raymond Zhong – climate change journalist, part of the 2021 Pulitzer Prize winning team for COVID-19 pandemic coverage, The New York Times''

See also

 Chinese journalists in New York City
 Filipino journalists in New York City
 Indian journalists in New York City
 Korean journalists in New York City
 LGBTQ journalists in New York City
 List of The New Yorker contributors
 Media in New York City

References

External links
 

Journalists from New York City
Lists of journalists
Lists of people from New York City
Articles with accessibility problems